Mitsui O.S.K. Lines (abbreviated MOL) is a Japanese transport company headquartered in Toranomon, Minato, Tokyo, Japan. It is one of the largest shipping companies in the world.

MOL fleet includes dry cargo ships (bulk carriers), liquefied natural gas carriers, Ro-Ro Car Carrier ships, oil tankers, container ships (among which mv MOL Triumph is the 4th largest containership in the world), and container terminals. Its alligator logo can still be seen on containers in ports, roads, rails and barges around the world, despite the company's focus on containers shipping has been reduced since April 2018.

Founded as a key part of the Mitsui zaibatsu (family-owned conglomerate) during the early industrialization of Japan, the company is now independent of the zaibatsu, but remains part of the Mitsui keiretsu (group of aligned companies).

Many heads of this company have wielded considerable power in Japan and abroad. One of the latest is Masaharu Ikuta, who has been appointed to head the newly privatized Japan Post.

History
MOL (Mitsui O.S.K. Lines) was launched in 1964, following the merger of  created in 1878, and Mitsui Steamship Co., Ltd. founded in 1942, formerly known as Mitsui Line, under the Law Concerning the Reconstruction and Reorganization of the Shipping Industry. At that time the company was the largest shipping company in Japan, capitalized at ¥13.1 billion, with 83 vessels aggregating .

1884-1950

OSK
OSK was founded in 1884, when 55 ship owners, each of whom had only a small number of vessels, combined their operations. The chief representative of these ship owners was Hirose Saihei, senior manager of the Sumitomo zaibatsu, or conglomerate, and a prominent figure in Osaka financial circles. OSK was capitalized at ¥1.2 million, with 93 vessels totalling .

In the first few years its routes were limited to coastal services in the western area of Japan. In 1890, OSK inaugurated an Osaka-Pusan run followed in 1893 by the operation of an Osaka-Incheon route and Korean coastal services. The company was recapitalized at ¥1.8 million in 1893, rising to ¥2.5 million in 1894, to ¥5 million in 1896, when the government of Taiwan granted OSK subsidies for Osaka-Taiwan liner services, and to ¥10 million in 1898 when the company started to operate on the Yangtze River.

In 1898, Tokugoro Nakahashi became the company's third president. He made a great effort to rationalize the internal organization of OSK, to penetrate the Chinese market, and also to inaugurate the first OSK ocean route, a Hong Kong to Tacoma, Washington service, in 1908. In 1911 OSK started a Kobe to Bombay service. The route was under the monopoly of the Far Eastern Freight Conference (FEFC) of which Nippon Yusen K.K. (NYK) was the only Japanese member. OSK fought against the FEFC and was admitted to the conference in 1913. In 1918, the company opened a Bombay to Marseilles route and was admitted to full membership of the FEFC. Meanwhile, it opened a San Francisco route, an Australia route, and a South America route, offering a worldwide liner service. It began a New York City service in 1920 but operated at a deficit. In 1930 OSK made a huge investment in five new high-speed motor ships in order to start a New York express service. This service entirely transformed raw-silk transportation from Asia to America; raw silk began to be carried by water all the way to New York instead of going by land. OSK's share of cargo shipped on this route grew, and its business performance improved in spite of unfavourable business conditions.

During the Great Depression, OSK and NYK made a cooperative agreement in 1931 whereby OSK abolished its Puget Sound route, which had called at Tacoma and Seattle, and in turn acquired a monopoly on the South American east coast route. OSK quickly recovered from the deficits of 1930 and 1931, and resumed paying dividends in 1932.

The company's profits peaked in 1941, when OSK was capitalized at ¥87 million and had 112 vessels aggregating .

Mitsui Bussan Kaisha

The Mitsui Line was originally the shipping department of the trading company Mitsui Bussan Kaisha. Mitsui Bussan was established in 1876 and obtained exclusive rights to export and market the coal mined at the state-run Miike mines. It chartered boats and transported coal on its own account. In 1878 it bought a steamship, and in 1888 it bought the mines. Mitsui Bussan became an industrial carrier and the shipping section was established in 1898. The section expanded to become the Shipping Department and moved to Kobe in 1904. The third general manager, Teijiro Kawamura, expanded the business of the department during World War I; in 1914 it began a tramp service carrying the company's own cargo and that of other companies. In 1917 it constructed a shipyard and set up the shipbuilding department and in 1920 it opened a semi-liner service from Dalian via Kobe to Seattle, whereby a liner service operated on outbound voyages but on the return voyage, owing to insufficient cargo at Seattle, ships had to stop and collect cargo at other ports.

Mitsui Bussan's Shipping Department built two sister ships in 1924. One was equipped with reciprocal oil-burners, the other had diesel engines and was the first ocean-going diesel ship in Japan. The department put these ships on the North American route and compared their performance. Akagisan Maru, the diesel ship, proved superior, and Mitsui concluded a manufacturing and marketing license agreement with Burmeister and Wain Co. (B & W), who had manufactured the engine, in 1926. In 1928 Mitsui opened a Bangkok route, in 1931 a Philippines route, in 1932 a Dalien to New York route, and in 1935 a Persian Gulf route. From 1933 the Shipping Department became known as Mitsui Line. In 1937 it owned 35 ships aggregating . The shipbuilding department was separated off as the Mitsui Tama Shipyard in 1937, and in 1942 the former Shipping Department too became a separate company, Mitsui Steamship Co., Ltd. (MS). It was capitalized at ¥50 million, and Takaharu Mitsui was elected chairman.

World War II
During World War II OSK, like other Japanese shipping companies, was forced to be a mere ship owner. When the war ended it had only 55 vessels left, totalling , most of which were so-called wartime standard ships, of poor quality. All ships were under control of the Allied powers through the Civilian Merchant Marine Committee. In 1950, however, OSK returned to global service. By the end of 1957 the company had almost recovered the sailing rights it had been given by the FEFC before the war, and was making 18 voyages per month on 13 overseas liner routes. Competition was far more intense than before the war, as anyone who had money could construct ships under the government-sponsored shipbuilding program, started in 1947. Before the war, conference members had sought to exclude newcomers. OSK constructed 38 ships under the program. In 1953 OSK established an eastbound route to South America to transport emigrants from Japan. At first the service was profitable, but the number of emigrants fell to below 2,000 per year in 1962. In 1963 OSK established the Japan Emigration Ship Co., Ltd. (JES) to hive off this loss making business. Later, JES was reorganized into Mitsui OSK Passenger Co., Ltd. In this period most of OSK's businesses were loss making. In 1964 it owned 41 vessels totalling . The company was capitalized at ¥7.6 billion and its debts totalled approximately ¥34.9 billion.

1950-1964
During World War II, and after the war, all MS ships were under the control of the government. When Japan lost the war in 1945, only 17 of MS's vessels were left, increasing to 22 vessels totalling  when MS re-acquired operations that had previously been chartered out to the Civilian Merchant Marine Committee (CMMC).

Post-War
MS then began a vigorous expansion of its fleet and routes to re-establish its pre-war network, and went so far as to apply to the FEFC. When its application was rejected, MS placed outsider—non-conference-member—ships on this route in 1953. After a long struggle, the conference attempted to resolve the issue politically and the British ambassador openly criticized Japan's shipping policies in 1955. Japan joined the General Agreement on Tariffs and Trade (GATT) the same year, and Japan's minister of transport was anxious to settle the issue without dispute. The final proposal of the conference, through the mediation of the minister of transport, contained extremely harsh conditions which MS had to accept, one of which was that MS could only join the FEFC if it operated under the management of NYK for several years. The 39-month battle was over, and MS began placing ships under the auspice of NYK in 1956. Five years later, MS at last joined the conference.

Shipbuilding
MS constructed 38 vessels between 1950 and its merger with OSK in 1964, and its operating tonnage was the largest in Japan. One of its ships, Kinkasan Maru, was the first bridge-controlled ship in the world. MS planned to rationalize its crews and at the same time improve the working conditions of engineers. It cooperated with Mitsui Shipbuilding & Engineering Co., a direct successor of Mitsui Tama Shipyard, and designed innovatory bridge-controlled ships. The Kinkasan Maru was delivered in 1961 and MS placed it, along with another bridge-controlled ship, on the New York route, which was re-opened in 1951. Besides the New York route, MS operated westbound and eastbound routes around the world, a Central and South America route, a West Africa route, and a Great Lakes route. In 1964 MS owned 45 vessels aggregating . However, MS's performance was disappointing from 1950 until the OSK merger in 1964, when it was capitalized at ¥5.5 billion and had debts of ¥26.7 billion.

Mitsui-OSK merger

Soon after the shipping industry reorganization of 1964, in which Japanese shipping companies were restructured into six groups, world shipping moved toward containerization. Mitsui O.S.K. Lines, Ltd. (MOL), formed by the merger of OSK and MS, began container services on the California route, joining a space-charter consortium of four Japanese operators.

Business results improved after the merger, and the loss brought forward was written off in 1966. The company was recapitalized at ¥20 billion in 1968, and at ¥30 billion in 1972. The owned fleet increased to 152 vessels, totalling  in 1974, and the operating fleet—owned vessels and time-chartered vessels—numbered 291 vessels, totalling .

Containerization
The first container ship, MOL's America Maru, sailed from Kobe to San Francisco in October 1969. Containerization spread to other routes, including the Australia route, with NYK and Yamashita-Shinnihon Steamship Co., in 1970; the North Pacific route, with five other Japanese companies, in 1971; and the Europe route, as part of the TRIO Group consisting of MOL, Nippon Yusen Kaisha, Overseas Container Line, Ben Line, and Hapag-Lloyd, in 1971. On the New York route and Mediterranean routes a container service began in 1972. In June 2013, one of its container ship, MOL Comfort, broke in two and sank off Yemen. The bow section caught fire before sinking. All 26 crew reported rescued by three other container ships that diverted to her, Hapag-Lloyd's Yantian Express, Hanjin Beijing of now defunct Hanjin Shipping and ZIM's ZIM India. The crews of three ships found them in two raft and one lifeboat.

Carrying ore
The other trend was toward specialization. Both OSK and MS had ore carriers, and after the merger MOL held the largest share of the Japanese ore market.

Cars
MOL built Oppama Maru, the first Car Carrier ship in Japan in 1965, under cargo guarantee from Nissan Motor Company. MOL could not carry cars at a low freight rate because it had to stick to the conference rate. Nissan therefore established the Nissan Motor Car Carrier Co. in 1970 to operate Oppama Maru and transport its cars. Based on this model, MOL and Honda Motor Co. established the Act Maritime Co. in 1973 to carry Honda cars to the United States.

MOL Ro-Ro Car Carrier division is named ACE (Auto Car Carrier Express), and majority of the Roll-on/roll-off vessels in the company fleet have the suffix "Ace" in their names.
The division specializes in maritime transport and distribution of brand new and used automobiles, trucks, trailers, Mafi roll trailers, heavy construction machineries and further types of rolling freight.

Since 1990, MOL has invested in the regional feeder line Euro Marine Logistics.

In July 2006, MOL-operated  suffered one of the worst stability accident in the industry. In that occasion, despite all her cargo was a total loss, the ship was salvaged and still sails.

On 1 January 2019, MV Sincerity Ace caught fire when sailing northwest of Oahu, en route from Japan to Honolulu port.
Several vessels sailing close by were diverted by the US Coast Guard to rescue her crew, however 4 fatalities and 1 missing person were reported.

On 17 February 2022, Felicity Ace caught fire close to Azores islands, en route from Emden to Davisville in US. The ship was fully loaded with Porsche and Volkswagen cars. After sending a distress signal, the 22 crew members were airlifted, while a Portuguese navy ship and four cargo vessels went to rescue, waiting for salvage tugs to arrive. The ship sank on 2 March while under tow.

Oil Crisis
The U.S. gold embargo in 1971 and the advent of a floating world monetary system was a severe blow for MOL. It changed its financial strategy, keeping more funds in U.S. dollars and in other currencies. More serious was the 1973 oil crisis. MOL immediately cancelled tankers under construction and recorded its best business performance since the merger; freight revenue topped ¥327.5 billion. Soon afterward, however, results deteriorated rapidly and the downslide continued until 1978.

MOL made great efforts to curtail costs, and simultaneously increased the size and number of container ships. Containerization increased on routes between industrially advanced and developing countries, and huge investment was needed to finance this expansion. The development of intermodal transportation on the North America route also began, and MOL introduced a Mini Land Bridge (MLB) service in 1972, using rail transport as well as shipping to reduce transit time, to compete with the U.S. shipping company Sea-Land, extending the service to IPI (Interior Point Intermodal) service in 1980.

Around the time that the MLB service started, the world trade structure began to change and in 1979 about 60% of general cargo from Asia to the United States came to be loaded at newly industrialized countries (NICs). MOL reorganized its routes, changing its starting ports for U.S. voyages from Japan to Hong Kong, Taiwan, and other NICs, while shipping companies in the newly industrialized countries captured this new demand and branched out into the Pacific routes. The competition in sea transportation increased and MOL began a direct container service between the Far East and the west coast of North America in 1982. MOL invested huge capital to consolidate these services and to establish a service network in the United States.

As a countermeasure against rising oil costs MOL built energy-efficient ships, cooperating with Mitsui Engineering & Shipbuilding. Awobasan Maru, delivered in 1981, was the first ship incorporating innovations that reduced fuel consumption by 30%. In 1974 MOL established the Saudi Arabian Shipping Co., Ltd. (SASCO) and Arabian Marine Operation Co. Ltd. (AMOCO) as joint ventures with the prince of Saudi Arabia in Jeddah. SASCO is the shipowner, while AMOCO manages tanker operations. MOL hoped that this joint venture would give it an advantageous status in any future nationalization of oil, but at first the performance of these companies was not good, and AMOCO acquired the rights to bunker supply in 1977. Two years later the second oil crisis occurred and MOL was able to get a stable bunker supply.

Scaling back

Personnel expenses increased after the first oil crisis, and the yen was revalued. These changes hit MOL heavily as a large part of its income was in U.S. dollars. To make itself more competitive, MOL reduced the number of its own vessels and increased the number of flag of convenience (FOC) ships; its own ships fell in number from 127 in 1975 to 82 in 1982, and the number of employees at sea from 3,127 to 2,233, while freight revenue increased from ¥282 billion to ¥476 billion over the same period. MOL also built highly rationalized ships in cooperation with MES, which would require a crew of only 18, the minimum number accepted by the Seamen's Act, while other ships required 22 or 24. The first super-advanced ship was the Canberra Maru, delivered in 1979, which was put on the Australia route.

Passenger service

In 1970 MOL established Mitsui OSK Passenger Co., Ltd. (MOP), with the reorganization of JES. MOP has three passenger ships. The company was the only one in Japan to operate an ocean-going passenger service at that time, but later in the 1990s a few Japanese shipping companies entered this market to cope with the boom in travelling by sea.

LNG
In 1983 the import of liquefied natural gas (LNG) on Free on Board (FOB) conditions began as part of the diversification of Japan's energy resources, and MOL, NYK, Kawasaki Steamship, Chubu Electric Power Company, Incorporated and other Japanese electricity and gas companies jointly established two specialized companies, Badak LNG Transport Inc. and Arun, to transport LNG from Indonesia. These two companies operated seven LNG ships, constructed by MOL and other shipping companies. MOL also took delivery in 1983 of the Kohzan Maru, Japan's first large-sized methanol carrier, and transported methanol from Saudi Arabia to Japan. Japan's exports of industrial plant grew at that time and modularization began. MOL was interested in the transportation of massive plants and took delivery of five specialized ships, including the Atlas Maru, equipped with a 600-ton capacity derrick, one of the largest in the world. Plant exports began to decline in the late 1980s and these special ships were mostly sold or changed their flags.

Restructuring
In 1984 the Maritime Act of the United States was revised and the mandatory independent action clause was introduced. This gave shipping companies the right to introduce a discount tariff if registered at the Federal Maritime Commission. The conferences on North American routes became extremely weak and freight rates on the routes dropped sharply. Every route between the Far East and the United States made losses and MOL's business performance deteriorated again. Once more, MOL worked hard to curtail expenses and establish greater competitiveness on these routes. In the same year it decided to enlarge its container terminal facilities at Los Angeles, and also installed its own container terminals at Asian ports, including Kaohsiung.

MOL also made great efforts to reorganize operations on the Pacific routes, dissolving the consortium of six Japanese companies. In 1985 it began a two-company consortium with Kawasaki Steamship's K Line service (KL) on the Japan/Pacific southwest route, and with East Asiatic Co. (EAC) on the Far East/Pacific southwest route. It also decided to start a three-company consortium with KL and EAC on the Pacific northwest route. On each route it began a weekly service with newly built large container ships. The first such ship, Asian Venture, was an FOC ship at 1,960 20 feet equivalent unit (TEU), indicating the number of containers loaded, and the main ships placed on this route became FOC ships after they were launched in 1984. Moreover, MOL began operating a double stack train service between Los Angeles, Chicago, and Columbus, Ohio in 1985 and extended it to New York in the following year.

The New York route became the most competitive because of this trend toward intermodal forms of transport. NYK, Yamashita-Shinnihon Steamship Co.--later merged with Japan Line to establish Nippon Liner Systems for liner business and Navix Lines for tramp business—and MOL began a joint operation service in 1986 and put on it six high-speed large vessels including MOL's Alligator series ships. To improve services, MOL introduced a computer booking system in 1984 and enlarged its online system to cover the United States and the Far East in 1986. This route, however, became lossmaking after 1986, seriously affecting the company's performance; MOL did not pay dividends between 1987 and 1989.

Fleet after restructuring 

 America Maru

Bulk carriers

 Aurora Light
 Brasil Maru
 Crystal Pioneer (woodchip carrier)
 Eigen
 Enchanter
 Energia Centaurus
 Grandis
 Envoyager
 Hokuetsu Delight (woodchip carrier)
 KN Arcadia
 Kurenai
 Lambert Maru
 Midnight Dream
 Mona Linden
 Pleiades Dream
 RMC Rigel
 Sea Navigator
 Shiyo
 Vega Dream
 Zebra Wind

Car carriers

 Adria Ace
 Amethyst Ace
 Aquamarine Ace 
 Aquarius Ace
 Azalea Ace
 Bergamot Ace
 Bravery Ace
 Camelia Ace
 Carnation Ace
 Comet Ace
 Cougar Ace
 Courageous Ace
 Crystal Ace
 Divine Ace
 Elegant Ace
 Emerald Ace
 Eminent Ace
 Eternal Ace
 Euphony Ace
 Felicity Ace
 Freedom Ace
 Frontier Ace
 Genuine Ace
 Galaxy Ace
 Gardenia Ace
 Gracious Ace
 Heroic Ace
 Iris Ace
 Istra Ace
 Liberty Ace
 Mercury Ace
 Meridian Ace
 Miraculous Ace
 Neptune Ace
 Onyx Ace
 Opal Ace
 Orca Ace
 Paradise Ace
 Pearl Ace
 Pegasus Ace
 Planet Ace
 Precious Ace
 Prime Ace
 Primrose Ace
 Prominent Ace
 Sanderling Ace
 Salvia Ace
 Sapphire Ace
 Serenity Ace
 Singa Ace
 Sunlight Ace
 Sunrise Ace
 Sunshine Ace
 Swallow Ace
 Swan Ace
 Swift Ace
 Tranquil Ace
 Triumph Ace
 Violet Ace
 Wisteria Ace

Cruise carriers

 Fuji Maru
 Nippon Maru

Ferries and domestic transportation

 Blue Diamond
 Sunflower Tomakomai

LNG carriers

 Abdelkader
 Al Aamriya
 Al Deebel
 Ben Badis
 Dukhan
 Fraiha
 Fukurokuju
 Fuwairit
 GDF Suez Point Fortin
 Grand Mereya
 LNG Aquarius
 LNG Aries
 LNG Capricorn
 LNG Ebisu
 LNG Jurojin
 LNG Pioneer
 LNG Taurus
 LNG Maleo
 Murwab
 Sun Arrows
 Surya Satsuma

Tankers
 
 Advance Victoria
 Ambassador Norris
 Asian Progress 3 
 Asian Progress 4 
 Atlantic Explorer
 Atlantic Pioneer
 Azumasan
 Breezy Victoria
 Chokaisan
 Eagle Trader
 Gassan 
 Great Tribute - LPG Carrier
 Guanabara
 Hakaisan 
 Hakkusan
 Isla de Bioko
 Ivy Express
 Kaimon 2 
 Kasagisan 
 Kashimasan 
 Katsuragisan 
 Kirishima
 Las Cuevas
 Libra Trader
 LPG/C Ayame - LPG Carrier
 Maracas Bay
 Mayaro
 Millennium Explorer - Methanol Carrier
 Mitake 
 Nariva
 Noble Express
 Noble Spirit - Methanol Carrier
 Opal Express
 Pacific Alliance
 Pacific Partner
 Pacific Voyager
 Pigeon Point
 Omega Trader 
 Oriental Jade
 Perseus Trader
 Phoenix Admiral
 Phoenix Advance
 Phoenix Vanguard 
 Phoenix Vigor
 Pico Basile
 Saamis Adventurer
 San Fernando
 Vemillion Express - Product Tanker
 Yufusan 
 Yakumasan

Container ships

 MOL Anchorage
 MOL Advantage
 MOL Bravery
 MOL Celebration
 MOL Comfort (written off - June 2013)
 MOL Competence 
 MOL Contribution
 MOL Courage
 MOL Cosmos
 MOL Creation
 MOL Dedication
 MOL Delight
 MOL Dignity
 MOL Diamond
 MOL Earnest
 MOL Efficiency
 MOL Eminence
 MOL Emissary
 MOL Empire
 MOL Endeavor
 MOL Endurance
 MOL Enterprise
 MOL Gateway
 MOL Grace
 MOL Grandeur
 MOL Maestro
 MOL Magnificence
 MOL Maneuver
 MOL Marvel
 MOL Matrix
 MOL Mission
 MOL Modern
 MOL Prestige (intermittently called MSC Prestige when she was under charter to MSC)
 MOL Proficiency
 MOL Triumph
 MOL Trust

Internationalization
MOL's financial activities became more international after the first oil crisis. The company issued corporate debentures and warrant bonds on the Swiss capital market. Shareholders' equity was ¥57.36 billion, and net income ¥5.94 billion in 1991.

In the same year, the number of directly owned vessels was 54, aggregating , and there were 296 operating vessels, aggregating .

New ship orders
In 2015 MOL announced its intention to order six new container ships that will be capable of carrying 20,150 20-foot containers. Other shipping groups have announced similar orders for ships of similar size, but when completed these ships will be among the largest container ships in the world.  Four ships are to be constructed at Samsung Heavy Industries shipyards in Korea and a further two will be constructed by Imabari Shipbuilding in Japan. The six vessels are set to be launched starting in 2017 and will serve routes between Asia and Europe.

2018 Container activities merge

On Monday 31 October 2016, Mitsui OSK Lines, Kawasaki Kisen Kaisha, and Nippon Yusen Kabushiki Kaisha agreed to merge their container shipping business via establishing a completely new joint venture company. The integration included their overseas terminal activities. 
The new joint venture company operating under the name "Ocean Network Express" from 1 April 2018, with the company headquarters in Japan (Tokyo), an business operation headquarters in Singapore and regional headquarters in United Kingdom (London), United States (Richmond, VA), Hong Kong, and Brazil (Sao Paulo).

2020 oil spill

On 25 July 2020, MOL-operated MV Wakashio ran aground and spilled oil at the South of Mauritius.

2022 Mikage autonomous voyage and docking

In August 2022, the MV Mikage successfully completed the first crewless sea voyage and docking of an autonomous coastal container ship, sailing 161-nautical miles, from Tsuruga to Sakai, in a two-day trial.

Subsidiaries

International Energy Transport Co., Ltd. (45%)
International Marine Transport Co., Ltd. (58%)
Mitsui OSK Passenger Line Co., Ltd. (51%)
M.O. Seaways, Ltd. (99%)
International Container Terminal (92%)
The Shosen Koun (62%)
Trans Pacific Container Service (90%)
Japan Express Co., Ltd. (Kobe) (86%)
Japan Express Co., Ltd. (Yokohama) (81%)
Blue Highway Line (25.4%)
Kusakabe Steamship Co., Ltd. (80%)
Mitsui OSK Kogyo Kaisha, Ltd. (79%)
Euromol B.V. (100%)
MOL International S.A. (100%)
MOL Maritime (India) Pvt. Ltd
Orange Finance Ltd. (100%)
Arabian Marine Bunker Sales Co., Ltd. (90%)
Tokyo Marine Asia Pte Ltd 
TraPac, LLC
MOL Chemical Tankers Pte. Ltd. (100%)

Fleet

References

Notes

Bibliography

 Chida, Momohei and Peter N. Davies. (1990). The Japanese Shipping and Shipbuilding Industries: A History of their Modern Growth. London: Athlone Press. ;  OCLC 20799046
 Tatsuki, Mariko, Tsuyoshi Yamamoto, John Haskell Kemble and Thomas Elliott. (1985).  The First Century of Mitsui O.S.K. Lines, Ltd. [Japan]: Mitsui O.S.K. Lines. OCLC 20624516

External links

Mitsui O.S.K. Lines web site 
MOL Global Liner Services web site
Largest Container Ship Operators by Capacity 
 List of seafarers currently working for MOL 
MOL Information Technology

Shipping companies of Japan
Mitsui
Container shipping companies
Transport companies based in Tokyo
Japanese brands
Companies listed on the Tokyo Stock Exchange
Japanese companies established in 1884
Transport companies established in 1884
Multinational companies headquartered in Japan
Car carrier shipping companies
Ro-ro shipping companies